Sebastián Calderón Centeno (born 20 January 1946) is a Mexican politician affiliated with the PAN. He served as Senator of the LX and LXI Legislatures of the Mexican Congress representing Campeche. He also served as Deputy during the LIX Legislature.

References

1946 births
Living people
Politicians from Ciudad del Carmen
Members of the Senate of the Republic (Mexico)
Members of the Chamber of Deputies (Mexico)
National Action Party (Mexico) politicians
21st-century Mexican politicians
Academic staff of the Autonomous University of Carmen